Events from the year 1879 in Bolivia.

Incumbents
President: Hilarión Daza

Events
February 14 - The War of the Pacific begins when 500 Chilean soldiers arrive by ship and occupied the port city of Antofagasta without a fight, in response to the National Congress of Bolivia's attempt to seize and auction the assets of the Antofagasta Nitrate & Railway Company.
March 23 - Battle of Topáter
November 2 - Battle of Pisagua
November 19 - Battle of San Francisco

Births
July 15 - Alcides Arguedas, historian (died 1946)

Deaths
March 23 - Eduardo Abaroa

References

 
1870s in Bolivia